Informally in mathematical logic, an algebraic theory is a theory that uses axioms stated entirely in terms of equations between terms with free variables.  Inequalities and quantifiers are specifically disallowed.  Sentential logic is the subset of first-order logic involving only algebraic sentences.

The notion is very close to the notion of algebraic structure, which, arguably, may be just a synonym.

Saying that a theory is algebraic is a stronger condition than saying it is elementary.

Informal interpretation

An algebraic theory consists of a collection of n-ary functional terms with additional rules (axioms).

For example, the theory of groups is an algebraic theory because it has three functional terms: a binary operation a × b, a nullary operation 1 (neutral element), and a unary operation x ↦ x−1 with the rules of associativity, neutrality and inverses respectively. Other examples include:
 the theory of semigroups
 the theory of lattices
 the theory of rings

This is opposed to geometric theory which involves partial functions (or binary relationships) or existential quantors − see e.g. Euclidean geometry where the existence of points or lines is postulated.

Category-based model-theoretical interpretation

An algebraic theory T is a category whose objects are natural numbers 0, 1, 2,..., and which, for each n, has an n-tuple of morphisms:

proji: n → 1, i = 1, ..., n

This allows interpreting n as a cartesian product of n copies of 1.

Example: Let's define an algebraic theory T taking hom(n, m) to be m-tuples of polynomials of n free variables X1, ..., Xn with integer coefficients and with substitution as composition. In this case proji is the same as Xi. This theory T is called the theory of commutative rings.

In an algebraic theory, any morphism n → m can be described as m morphisms of signature n → 1. These latter morphisms are called n-ary operations of the theory.

If E is a category with finite products, the full subcategory Alg(T, E) of the category of functors [T, E] consisting of those functors that preserve finite products is called the category of T-models or T-algebras.

Note that for the case of operation 2 → 1, the appropriate algebra A will define a morphism

A(2) ≈ A(1) × A(1) → A(1)

See also
Algebraic sentence
Algebraic definition

References
 Lawvere, F. W., 1963, Functorial Semantics of Algebraic Theories, Proceedings of the National Academy of Sciences 50, No. 5 (November 1963), 869-872
 Adámek, J., Rosický, J., Vitale, E. M., Algebraic Theories. A Categorical Introduction To General Algebra
 Kock, A., Reyes, G., Doctrines in categorical logic, in Handbook of Mathematical Logic, ed. J. Barwise, North Holland 1977
 

Mathematical logic